The Banishment Act or Bishops' Banishment Act (9 Will 3 c.1) was a 1697 Act of the Parliament of Ireland which banished all ordinaries and regular clergy of the Roman Catholic Church from Ireland. By 1 May 1698 all "popish archbishops, bishops, vicars general, deans, jesuits, monks, friars, and other regular popish clergy" had to be in one of several named ports awaiting a ship out of the country. Remaining or entering the country after this date would be punished as a first offence with 12 months' imprisonment followed by expulsion. A second offence constituted high treason.

The act was one of the Penal Laws passed after the Williamite War to safeguard the Church of Ireland as the established church and from fears of Catholic clerical support for Jacobitism. It was foreshadowed by proclamations issued by the Dublin Castle administration in 1673 and 1678 with similar terms. The banishment was originally and most effectively applied to regular clergy, many of whom registered (under the Registration Act 1704) as parish priests to be treated as secular clergy and avoid deportation. The ban on bishops may have been intended to prevent ordination of new priests, which, coupled with a ban on clerical immigration, would lead to their eventual extinction. Of the eight Catholic bishops in Ireland when the act was passed, two left, one (John Sleyne) was arrested, and five went into hiding. The port authorities paid for the passage of 424 clerics who emigrated; Mary of Modena estimated that about 700 in total left, of whom 400 settled in France. Priest hunters were active in subsequent decades. Maurice Donnellan, Bishop of Clonfert, was arrested in 1703 but rescued by an armed crowd.

Amendment and repeal
The act was gradually less stringently enforced as the eighteenth century progressed. The Roman Catholic Relief Act 1782 provided that its provisions could not apply to a priest who had registered and taken the oath of supremacy. The act was explicitly repealed by the Statute Law Revision (Ireland) Act 1878.

See also
Catholic Emancipation
Irish Church Act 1869
Roman Catholicism in Ireland

References

Sources
Primary
 
 
 
Secondary
 
 ; reprinted in

Citations

1697 in law
1697 in Ireland
Penal Laws in Ireland
Exile
Mary of Modena